The Qld Murri Carnival (QAIHC Arthur Beetson Foundation Murri Rugby League Carnival) is an annual four-day rugby league carnival for Aboriginal and Torres Strait Islanders Queensland rugby league teams. Queensland Rugby League (QRL) has awarded the Arthur Beetson Foundation with the tender for the next few years to host the Qld State Championships as part of the Carnival. The Foundation has employed MRL Qld Pty Ltd to event manage the Murri Rugby League carnival.

About

The carnival has certain basic rules. An adult person cannot play in the carnival unless they:
 undergo a health check; and
 enrol to vote or, if enrolled, make sure that their enrolment details are current.

An under 15 player cannot play in the carnival unless they:
 undergo a health check; and
 have a 90% school attendance record from 1 July to the date of the Carnival.

The Queensland Aboriginal & Islander Health Council have established a partnership with the Arthur Beetson Foundation, to support the organisation and running of the Qld Murri Carnival so that it is as an alcohol, smoke, drug and sugar-free event to help better health outcomes for the community.

Murri Carnival Winners

QLD Murri vs. NSW Koori Interstate Challenge
The QLD Murri vs. NSW Koori Interstate Challenge is an annual rugby league game played between the winners of the NSW Koori Knockout and Murri Rugby League Carnival. It is played each year (except in a World Cup year) in Queensland as part of the Indigenous All Stars event and is delivered by the Arthur Beetson Foundation like the Qld Murri Carnival as an alcohol, smoke, drug and sugar-free event to help better health outcomes for the community.

Representative Sides

Festival of Indigenous Rugby League
The NRL launched a Festival of Indigenous Rugby League program to take the place of the prestigious pre-season Rugby League All Stars game following every World Cup year. The 2014 Festival of Indigenous Rugby League featured a trial match between the Newcastle Knights and an Indigenous team, drawn from the NSW Koori Rugby League Knockout and Murri Carnivals in Queensland, as well as the NRL Indigenous Player Cultural Camp, Murri vs Koori women's and Under 16s representative games, a Murri v Koori match, a jobs expo and community visits.

2018 Festival of Indigenous Rugby League
2018 Festival of Indigenous Rugby League created a strong connection between the Maori and First Nation teams. With a strong showcase of cultural celebration from both teams. The 2018 Festival of Indigenous Rugby League was held at Redfern Oval featuring a Double header between the First Nation Goannas v NZ Maori and First Nation Gems v NZ Maori Ferns, And a curtain raiser game for the Koori vs Murri Interstate challenge Between Newcastle Yowies and Dhadin Geai Warriors .

2014 Representative squad

Indigenous NRL players to play in Murri Carnival
 Ben Barba
 Nathan Blacklock
 Dane Gagai
 Yileen Gordon
 Rod Jensen
 Brenko Lee
 Edrick Lee
 Robert Lui
 David Peachey
 Steve Renouf
 Chris Sandow
 Sam Thaiday
 Travis Waddell
 Kierran Moseley

See also

 Murri Rugby League Team
 Indigenous Australians
 Murri people
 Torres Strait Islanders
 NSW Koori Knockout

References

2011 establishments in Australia
Recurring sporting events established in 2011
Sports leagues established in 2011
Queensland Rugby League
Indigenous Australian sport
Rugby league competitions in Queensland